Une zone à défendre is an upcoming French romantic drama film written and directed by Romain Cogitore, starring François Civil and Lyna Khoudri. This is the first French original Disney+ film and is set to be released in France and around the world in the streaming platform in 2023.

Plot
Greg is an undercover police lieutenant who must collect information on eco-activists and infiltrates a movement that fights to save a forest from the building of a dam. There he meets Myriam, a zadist, and they fall in love on the Zone to Defend.

Cast
 François Civil as Greg
 Lyna Khoudri as Myriam
 Félix Bossuet	as Fissou
 Nathalie Richard as Severine
 Nico Rogner as Niko
 Oona von Maydell as Jana
 Mona Walravens as Lucia
 Manon Bresch as Fred
 Candice Bouchet as Bene
 Bellamine Abdelmalek as Naël
 Céline Carrère as Catherine
 Giacomo Fadda	as Tonio
 Arnaud Churin	as Hubert
 Hadi Rassi as Zap

Production

Development
Director and screenwriter Romain Cogitore announced the project (then-titled Zad) in an interview for French newspaper Dernières Nouvelles d'Alsace on 26 February 2016. The screenplay was co-written by Cogitore, Thomas Bidegain and Catherine Paillé, and it was inspired by a real-life scandal that happened in England and hit the European press in 2011 and revealed long-term police missions of eco-infiltrators, some of them even had children with activists before disappearing.

On 11 July 2022, Disney+ announced the shooting of its first original French film, Une zone à défendre, directed by Romain Cogitore with François Civil and Lyna Khoudri in the lead roles. The film is set to be released on Disney+ in France and around the world in 2023. Cogitore had previously directed Civil in the 2011 World War II drama Nos résistances. Une zone à défendre is the third collaboration between Civil and Khoudri, who had worked together on the French dubbing of the animated film Lightyear in 2022, and also co-starred in the two-part saga The Three Musketeers: D'Artagnan and The Three Musketeers: Milady, both scheduled to be released in 2023. Mathieu Lamboley composed the film's original score.

Cogitore explained the film in a press release: 
With 'A Zone to Defend', I want to place environmental and political issues within the framework of a love story, to place myself in a double cinematographic genre - the undercover film and melodrama - to recount a moment in our contemporary history, which zadists and collapsologists call "the collapse of the old world".

Filming
Principal photography started on 13 June 2022 and wrapped on 12 August 2022. Filming took place in Paris, Essonne, Marseille, Normandy and Melun.

Marketing
Disney France unveiled on Twitter the first image from the film with François Civil and Lyna Khoudri on 12 November 2022. On 29 January 2023, Disney France unveiled a new image of Civil on the set of the film to celebrate the actor's birthday.

References

External links 
 
 Une zone à défendre on Disney France

Upcoming films
2023 films
2023 drama films
French romantic drama films
2020s French films
2020s French-language films
Environmental films
French films based on actual events
Films about activists
Films about police officers
Films set in France
Films shot in Paris
Films shot in Normandy
Films shot in Marseille
Films with screenplays by Thomas Bidegain
Disney+ original films